Cary Weston (born 1972) is an American politician from Maine. A Republican from Bangor, Weston served on the Bangor City Council from 2009 to 2012. In 2011–12, Weston served as the Council Chairman (Mayor). Prior to his election to City Council, Weston was the founding chair of a networking group of young professionals in their 20s and 30s called 'Fusion Bangor'.

In September 2013, Weston announced that he would challenge Democratic incumbent State Senator Geoffrey Gratwick for District 32, which encompasses all of Bangor and neighboring Hermon. In November 2014, Gratwick was re-elected to the Maine Senate, defeating  Weston. Gratwick won a majority of the votes in Bangor, while Weston won the smaller town of Hermon.

Personal
Weston is a graduate of Bangor High School and the University of Maine. In 2004, he graduated from the Bangor Region Leadership Institute.

References

1972 births
Living people
University of Maine alumni
Mayors of Bangor, Maine
Maine Republicans
Bangor City Council members
Bangor High School (Maine) alumni